The Melbourne Racing Club (MRC) is one of three metropolitan horse racing clubs in Melbourne, Victoria, Australia. It began life as the Victoria Amateur Turf Club, in 1875 with Mr. E.C. Moore as the club's first Secretary. The Dowling Forest Racecourse in Ballarat was the location for the first VATC race meeting on Friday, 24 March 1876. Within six months the VATC were granted use of Crown land at Caulfield as a permanent home in Melbourne.

History and race meetings
In 1879, the club staged the first running of the Caulfield Cup, and two years later, introduced the Caulfield Guineas and the Toorak Handicap. In addition the Caulfield Cup was switched to the spring racing season and became the lead up race to the Melbourne Cup. The Futurity Stakes was added to the racing calendar in 1898. The Club suffered the loss of the Members' Stand in 1922 when it was destroyed by fire, and five years later the Guineas Stand was also burnt down.

The military occupied Caulfield Racecourse in 1940 for a period of four years when it became a depot and barracks for army recruits during the Second World War. The then Vice-President of the United States, Richard Nixon attended the Caulfield Cup meeting in 1953.

In 1963 the Melbourne Racing Club, which had been created from an amalgamation of the Williamstown Racing Club and the Victorian Racing and Trotting Association, was incorporated into the VATC. Following the merger, the newest of Melbourne's race tracks, Sandown Racecourse, was opened on 19 June 1965 in front of a crowd of over 52,000.

The first Blue Diamond Stakes, a race for 2-year-olds, was run at Caulfield in 1971 and won by Tolerance.

The glass-fronted Rupert Clarke Grandstand, which replaced the main Caulfield grandstand of the 1920s, was opened in 1992.

With the increase in the number of visiting international horses to the Melbourne Spring Racing Carnival a permanent Quarantine Centre was established by the VATC at Sandown Racecourse in 1997.

In 2001 the Club commenced a five-year, $20 million, strategic plan which included the establishment of 20 feature race days at Caulfield; construction of a second turf track at Sandown to be known as Hillside, with the existing circuit being renamed Lakeside; a major upgrade of facilities and training tracks at Caulfield; and the change of club name from Victoria Amateur Turf Club to Melbourne Racing Club.

Jumps racing is conducted at the Sandown track during the winter months, the blue ribbon events being the Australian Steeple and the Australian Hurdle.

See also

 Thoroughbred racing in Australia
 Moonee Valley Racing Club
 Victoria Racing Club

References

External links
Melbourne Racing Club

Horse racing organisations in Australia
Sporting clubs in Melbourne
1875 establishments in Australia
Sports clubs established in 1875
Horse racing in Melbourne